The Waverly Public Library, located in Waverly, Iowa, is a public library that serves Waverly and the surrounding counties of Bremer and Butler.  As of April 2011, the library contains 66,790 volumes, including over 2,000 DVDs and over 1,000 CDs.  The library circulates approximately 166,909 items every year.

History
In 1857, two years before Waverly was incorporated, a committee was organized for the purpose of collecting books for the public's general use.  Ten years later the First Baptist Church housed the collection in their new building.  The Waverly Public Free Library was created in 1868, following a lecture series which raised more than $300.  This lecture series included programs featuring Clara Barton, Frederick Douglass, John Heyl Vincent, and Paul Du Chaillu.  The money raised was placed in a fund for developing an actual library building. The books were next stored in the Waverly Opera House, and then moved to rooms over Broadie's Drug Store in 1901.
On February 20, 1903, Andrew Carnegie, a wealthy New York philanthropist, awarded Waverly a $10,000 grant to construct a new library building.  The new library was dedicated on January 1, 1905, and opened to the public for their use.  At that time, the population of Waverly was 2,916 and the library owned less than 2,000 books. 
By 1965, the library had 7,872 registered borrowers, and the collection totaled over 30,000 books.  A "wrap-around" structure was built in 1968 to accommodate the increase in patrons and materials.
In 1992, the city of Waverly ordered that a study be done to consider the library's future options.  It was decided that a new library building would be constructed at a different location, and so in 1998 the present building was completed.

Directors
Following is a list of the men and women who have provided leadership at the Waverly Public Library through their role as Director.

1857           C.T. Smeed
1878           Miss Josie Powell
1879           Mrs. Thompson Hauser
1881-1891      Rev. John Hodges
1891-1894      Sylvia Fitzgerald
1894           Anna Mills
1896-1900      Mrs. Joseph Brown
1901-1903      Mae Brotherton
1903-1910      Mary Whitmire (died 1910)
1910-1911      Dr. Vera Norton
1911           Marian Grawe (interim)
1911-1933      Emma L. Kenney
1933-1937      Florence A. Grove
1937-1954      Arlene Russell
1954-1956      Rachel Agg
1956-1958      Clara Johnson
1958-1973      Marjorie Humby
1973-1975      Steve Rogge
1976           G. Shirley Duis
1976           Jane Huck (interim)
1976-2005      Patricia Coffie
2005–present   Sarah Meyer-Reyerson

Services
Interactive videoconference rooms, wireless internet access, 18 public internet computers and computer classes are available for public use. Three Nintendo Switch's with games are available for public use as well.  Children and their parents can take advantage of a summer reading program, preschool storytime, toddler storytime, and a Family Bookclub.  A Teen Advisory Board exists which plans creative activities for the community's youth, including weekly game events and Friday Night Computer tournaments.
An active Friends of the Waverly Public Library group is a non-profit organization that provides volunteer support and funding for library projects.  These include bus trips to the library for elementary classes, books for new babies at the local hospital, books for kindergarten students, and used book and magazine sales.

References

External links 
 The Carnegie Libraries in Iowa Project.com 
 NEIBORS Downloadable Audiobooks.com

Library buildings completed in 1905
Public libraries in Iowa
Education in Bremer County, Iowa
Buildings and structures in Bremer County, Iowa
Carnegie libraries in Iowa
Waverly, Iowa
1905 establishments in Iowa